Rassmna A'la Al-Qlb Wagh Al-Watan ("We painted, on the heart, homeland's face" or "We engraved, on hearts, the sights of homeland") is the anthem of the Egyptian Armed Forces. The Lyrics were written by Farouk Gouida and composed by Kamal Al-Taweel.

Lyrics

See also 
 Egyptian National Anthem
 Eslami ya Misr

Anthems of Egypt
Military of Egypt